The 419th Flight Test Squadron  is a United States Air Force squadron.  It is assigned to the 412th Operations Group, Air Force Materiel Command, stationed at Edwards Air Force Base, California.

During World War II, the 419th Bombardment Squadron was a Boeing B-17 Flying Fortress squadron, assigned to the 301st Bombardment Group of Fifteenth Air Force. It earned two Distinguished Unit Citations.  In 1958, the squadron was activated as a Boeing B-47 Stratojet squadron as part of Strategic Air Command's nuclear force, but was discontinued four years later.  In 1993, the squadron was consolidated with the 6519th Test Squadron, which had been conducting test operations at Edwards since 1989.

Overview
The 419th performs flight testing on B-2 Spirit, B-1 Lancer, and Boeing B-52 Stratofortress strategic bombers.

History

World War II
The squadron was first organized as the 29th Reconnaissance Squadron a Boeing B-17 Flying Fortress squadron in February 1942.  In April 1942, it became the 419th Bombardment Squadron, a heavy bomber.  It trained under Second Air Force.  It flew antisubmarine patrols off the California coast from late May to early June 1942, then over the Mid-Atlantic coast during June and July 1942.

It deployed to European Theater of Operations in August 1942, being assigned to VIII Bomber Command, one of the first B-17 heavy bomb squadrons assigned to England.  It engaged in strategic bombardment operations over Occupied Europe, attacking enemy military and industrial targets.  It moved to the Mediterranean Theater of Operations as part of Operation Torch, the invasion of North Africa.  It operated from desert airfields in Algeria and Tunisia during North African and Tunisian campaign.   It became part of Northwest African Strategic Air Force during Invasion of Sicily and later Italy in 1943.  It was part of Fifteenth Air Force for the strategic bombing of Nazi Germany and occupied Europe.  It attacked enemy targets primarily in the Balkans; Southern France; Southern Germany and Austria from southern Italy.  It engaged in shuttle bombing missions to airfields in the Soviet Union during the summer of 1944.

Its personnel largely demobilized after German capitulation in May 1945. The squadron moved to the United States and was programmed for conversion to Boeing B-29 Superfortress operations and deployment to Pacific Theater, plans canceled after Japanese capitulation in August 1945.  Its aircraft were sent to storage and unit inactivated largely as a paper unit in October 1945.

Strategic Air Command
From 1958, the Boeing B-47 Stratojet wings of Strategic Air Command (SAC) began to assume an alert posture at their home bases, reducing the amount of time spent on alert at overseas bases.  The SAC alert cycle divided itself into four parts: planning, flying, alert and rest to meet General Thomas S. Power's initial goal of maintaining one third of SAC’s planes on fifteen minute ground alert, fully fueled and ready for combat to reduce vulnerability to a Soviet missile strike. To implement this new system B-47 wings reorganized from three to four squadrons. The 419th was activated at Lockbourne Air Force Base as the fourth squadron of the 301st Bombardment Wing.  The alert commitment was increased to half the squadron's aircraft in 1962 and the four squadron pattern no longer met the alert cycle commitment, so the squadron was inactivated on 1 January 1962.

Flight test squadron
The 6519th Flight Test Squadron activated at Edwards Air Force Base in October 1989, taking over the Air Force Flight Test Center's Strategic Systems Division (B-52G/H Stratofortress).  It also operated Unmanned Aeria Vehicle test program MQ-1 Predator 1994–2000 when the UAV program was realigned.   It gained the Rockkwell B-1 Lancer program from the 6510th Flight Test Squadron in 1991.  In October 1992, the 6519th was consolidated with the 419th, with the consolidated unit assuming the designation of 419th Test Squadron.  It added the B-2 Spirit program from the inactivating 420th Flight Test Squadron on 30 December 1997.

The squadron also hosts the C-12 Huron Formal Training Unit.

Lineage
 419th Bombardment Squadron
 Constituted as the 29th Reconnaissance Squadron (Heavy) on 28 January 1942
 Activated on 3 February 1942
 Redesignated 419th Bombardment Squadron (Heavy) on 22 April 1942
 Redesignated 419th Bombardment Squadron, Heavy c. 6 March 1944
 Redesignated 419th Bombardment Squadron, Very Heavy on 5 August 1945
 Inactivated on 15 October 1945
 Redesignated 419th Bombardment Squadron, Medium on 20 August 1958
 Activated on 1 December 1958
 Discontinued and inactivated on 1 January 1962
 Consolidated with the 6519th Test Squadron as the 6519th Test Squadron on 1 October 1992

 419th Flight Test Squadron
 Designated as the 6519th Test Squadron and activated on 10 March 1989
 Consolidated with the 419th Bombardment Squadron on 1 October 1992
 Redesignated 419th Test Squadron on 2 October 1992
 Redesignated 419th Flight Test Squadron on 1 March 1994

Assignments
 301st Bombardment Group, 3 Feb 1942 – 15 Oct 1945
 301st Bombardment Wing, 1 Dec 1958 – 1 Jan 1962
 6510th Test Wing (later 412th Test Wing), 10 March 1989
 412th Operations Group, 1 Oct 1993 – present

Stations

 Geiger Field, Washington, 3 February 1942
 Alamogordo Army Air Field, New Mexico, 28 May 1942
 Operated from Muroc Army Air Base, California, c. 28 May - 14 June 1942
 Richard E. Byrd Field, Virginia, 21 June - 19 July 1942
 RAF Chelveston (AAF-105), England, 19 August 1942
 Tafaraoui Airfield, Algeria, 24 November 1942
 Biskra Airfield, Algeria, 21 December 1942
 Ain M'lila Airfield, Algeria, 16 January 1943

 Saint-Donat Airfield, Algeria, 8 March 1943
 Oudna Airfield, Tunisia, 6 August 1943
 Cerignola Airfield, Italy, 10 December 1943
 Lucera Airfield, Italy, 2 February 1944 – July 1945
 Sioux Falls Army Air Field, South Dakota, 28 July 1945
 Mountain Home Army Air Field, Idaho, 17 August 1945
 Pyote Army Air Base, Texas, 23 August – 15 October 1945.
 Lockbourne Air Force Base, Ohio, 1 December 1958 – 1 January 1962
 Edwards Air Force Base, California, 10 Mar 1989 – present

Aircraft

 B-17 Flying Fortress, 1942–1945
 B-47 Stratojet, 1959–1961
 B-52 Stratofortress, 1989–Present

 MQ-1 Predator (UAV), 1994–2000
 B-1 Lancer, 1991–Present
 B-2 Spirit, 1997–Present

See also

 List of United States Air Force test squadrons
 Boeing B-17 Flying Fortress Units of the Mediterranean Theater of Operations

References

Notes

Bibliography

 Freeman, Roger A. (1978) Airfields of the Eighth: Then and Now. After the Battle 
 
 
 Millet, Jeffrey R. The Fifteenth Air Force Story: A History 1943–1985. Fifteenth Air Force Association, 1986.
 John Pimlott, B-29 Superfortress, Gallery Books, 1980.
 
 

419
Military units and formations in California
Military units and formations established in 1994